

35001–35100 

|-id=053
| 35053 Rojyurij ||  || Yurij Arsentyevich Roj (born 1948) is an expert on laser ranging, space and ground-based communication systems, and a key participant in the Russian lunar program. He is a member of the K. E. Tsiolkovsky Russian Academy of Cosmonautics. || 
|-id=056
| 35056 Cullers || 1984 ST || Kent Cullers, American physicist || 
|-id=062
| 35062 Sakuranosyou || 1988 EP || Sakuranosyou, the Musashino Sakurano Elementary School, in Musashino, Tokyo, Japan, on the occasion of the tenth anniversary of the school's founding || 
|-id=076
| 35076 Yataro ||  || Yataro Iwasaki, close friend of Sakamoto Ryōma and played a crucial role in bringing about the Meiji Restoration || 
|-id=087
| 35087 von Sydow ||  || Max von Sydow (1929–2020), a Swedish screen actor. || 
|-id=093
| 35093 Akicity ||  || Aki City, in eastern Kochi prefecture, Japan || 
|}

35101–35200 

|-id=137
| 35137 Meudon ||  || Meudon, a small town near Paris  || 
|-id=165
| 35165 Québec ||  || Quebec City, Québec, Canada || 
|-id=197
| 35197 Longmire || 1994 LH || Matthew J. Longmire, American(?) electrical engineer and pioneer of the astronomical CCD revolution † || 
|}

35201–35300 

|-id=222
| 35222 Delbarrio ||  || Bianca Del Barrio, wife of Francesco Gallotti, a member of the Osservatorio di Montelupo (Montelupo Observatory) || 
|-id=229
| 35229 Benckert ||  || Johann Peter Benckert, 18th-century German sculptor || 
|-id=233
| 35233 Krčín || 1995 KJ || Jakub Krčín of Jelčany, 16th-century Czech hydraulic engineer, designer of ponds such as Rožmberk Pond, Bohemia || 
|-id=237
| 35237 Matzner || 1995 QP || Antonín Matzner, Czech musicologist † || 
|-id=239
| 35239 Ottoseydl ||  || Otto Seydl (1884–1959), Czech populariser of astronomy, worked on stellar statistics and later on history of astronomy in Bohemia. He served as the director of the State Observatory in Klementinum in Prague (1939–1942 and 1945–1948). He was a member of the IAU and The Czech Astronomical Society. || 
|-id=265
| 35265 Takeosaitou ||  || Takeo Saitou (born 1934), a member of the Yamagata Astronomical Society. || 
|-id=268
| 35268 Panoramix || 1996 QY || Panoramix, also known as Getafix, is the village druid in the cartoon series Les aventures d´Asterix by Uderzo and Goscinny || 
|-id=269
| 35269 Idefix ||  || Idefix, also known as Dogmatix, is small white dog belonging to Obelix in the cartoon series Les aventures d´Asterix by Uderzo and Goscinny || 
|-id=270
| 35270 Molinari || 1996 RL || Emilio Molinari (born 1963), developed his astronomical career in Brera Observatory, Milan, beginning with the study of distant clusters of galaxies then shifting to technology group. He now serves as director of the Telescopio Nazionale Galileo and Rapid Eye Mount observatories. || 
|-id=274
| 35274 Kenziarino ||  || Kenzi Arino (born 1947), a member of the Yamagata Astronomical Society. || 
|-id=283
| 35283 Bradtimerson ||  || Bradley W. Timerson (1950–2018) was a science teacher, weather spotter, amateur seismologist and active member of IOTA. Brad served as IOTA VP for Planetary Occultations, where he mentored observers and analyzed hundreds of submitted asteroidal occultations. || 
|-id=286
| 35286 Takaoakihiro ||  || Akihiro Takao, Japanese amateur astronomer, member of the Matsue Astronomy Club || 
|-id=295
| 35295 Omo || 1996 VM || On the banks of the Omo River in Ethiopia, archaeologists have found fossil fragments of early Olduwan hominids. The site was designated a UNESCO World Heritage Site in 1980. || 
|}

35301–35400 

|-id=313
| 35313 Hangtianyuan ||  || Zhongguo Hangtianyuan Zhongxin (Astronaut Center of China), in Beijing Space City || 
|-id=316
| 35316 Monella ||  || Rinaldo Monella, Italian amateur astronomer † || 
|-id=324
| 35324 Orlandi ||  || Stefano Orlandi, worker in the T.L.C. Observatory for deep-sky photography and astrometry of comets and minor planets. || 
|-id=325
| 35325 Claudiaguarnieri ||  || Claudia Guarnieri, student of the science of architecture at the University of Parma. || 
|-id=326
| 35326 Lucastrabla ||  || Luca Strabla, Italian engineer and amateur astronomer. || 
|-id=334
| 35334 Yarkovsky ||  || Ivan Osipovich Yarkovsky, 19th-century Russian engineer who put forward the idea of what is now called the Yarkovsky effect || 
|-id=346
| 35346 Ivanoferri || 1997 JX || Ivano Ferri (born 1946) is an Italian amateur astronomer, who has been at the T.L.C. Observatory since its 1991 foundation. || 
|-id=347
| 35347 Tallinn ||  || Known as Kolyvan, and later as Reval, the Finnic-speaking community became the northernmost member of the Hanseatic League in 1285 || 
|-id=350
| 35350 Lespaul ||  || Les Paul, famous guitarist || 
|-id=352
| 35352 Texas ||  || Texas, the largest state in the continental U.S. || 
|-id=356
| 35356 Vondrák ||  || Jan Vondrák, Czech astronomer, president of IAU Division I, 2007 winner of the Nušl Prize of the Česká astronomická společnost (ČAS, Czech Astronomical Society) || 
|-id=357
| 35357 Haraldlesch ||  || Harald Lesch, professor of astronomy and astrophysics at the University of Munich || 
|-id=358
| 35358 Lorifini ||  || Lorella Fini, daughter-in-law of the first discoverer || 
|-id=364
| 35364 Donaldpray || 1997 UT || Donald P. Pray, American amateur astronomer || 
|-id=365
| 35365 Cooney || 1997 UU || Walter R. Cooney Jr., American amateur astronomer || 
|-id=366
| 35366 Kaifeng ||  || Kaifeng, a city located on the southern bank of the Yellow River in northern Henan province, China || 
|-id=370
| 35370 Daisakyu ||  || Tottori-Dai-Sakyu ("Tottori Sand Dunes"), Japan's greatest sand dune, near Tottori City which merged with Saji Village, where the Saji Observatory is located, in 2004 || 
|-id=371
| 35371 Yokonozaki ||  || Yoko Nozaki (born 1965) is a curator at Higashiyamato City Museum who has shared astronomy with the general public for many years. She is one of the most famous planetarium communicators in Japan. || 
|-id=391
| 35391 Uzan ||  || Jean-Philippe Uzan (born 1969) is a French theoretical physicist, renowned for his research on gravitation and relativistic cosmology. He has received several awards, including the Georges Lemaître prize, and is deeply involved in scientific outreach both by publishing popular books and mixing art and science. || 
|-id=394
| 35394 Countbasie ||  || Count Basie (1904–1984) was an American jazz pianist, organist, bandleader and composer. One of the greatest jazz musicians of the 20th century, he founded the Count Basie Orchestra in 1935 and left an impressive discography. || 
|}

35401–35500 

|-id=403
| 35403 Latimer ||  || Truett Latimer (born 1928) an American IMAX film producer and former president of the Houston Museum of Natural Science, was instrumental in the bold expansion of the museum in 1986, including in 1989 the building of its satellite facility, the George Observatory (Src). || 
|-id=419
| 35419 Beckysmethurst ||  || Becky Smethurst (born 1990) is a British astrophysicist currently working at the University of Oxford. Her research concerns galaxies and their supermassive black holes. She maintains a very high quality YouTube channel with over 100.000 subscribers. || 
|-id=429
| 35429 Bochartdesaron ||  || Jean Baptiste Gaspard Bochart de Saron (1730–1794) was a French magistrate and president of the Paris parliament. An amateur astronomer and mathematician, he was the first to compute a circular orbit for Uranus, and he computed orbits for many of Messier's comets until his death during the French Revolution. || 
|-id=441
| 35441 Kyoko ||  || Kyoko Iwasaki (born 1978), a Japanese swimmer who received a gold medal in the women's 200-m breast stroke at the Barcelona Olympics in 1992. She is not only a superior athlete in Japan, but also the youngest gold medallist in the history of the world's swim meets. || 
|-id=444
| 35444 Giuliamarconcini ||  || Giulia Marconcini (born 1991) has a masters degree in construction engineering-architecture with honors. Her first work was the reinforced concrete structure supporting the dome of the astronomical observatory K83 "Beppe Forti" in Montelupo Fiorentino. || 
|-id=446
| 35446 Stáňa ||  || Stáňa (Stanislava) Setváková, Czech staff member of the Prague Planetarium and wife of meteorologist Martin Setvák. || 
|-id=461
| 35461 Mazzucato ||  || Michele Mazzucato, (born 1962) is an amateur astronomer and discoverer of minor planets whose main fields of interest are the history of astronomy, geometrical geodesy and astrometry of minor planets. A member of several scientific associations, he has written many articles and books, principally on geodesy and astronomy topics. || 
|-id=462
| 35462 Maramkaire ||  || Maram Kaire (born 1978) is a Senegalese astronomer and founder of the Senegalese Association for the Promotion of Astronomy. He has supervised stellar occultation missions in collaboration with NASA. He is a member of the African Initiative for Planetary and Space Science and the representative of the IAU in Senegal. || 
|-id=464
| 35464 Elisaconsigli ||  || Elisa Consigli (born 1981) a marketing executive and niece of Italian amateur astronomer Maura Tombelli, who co-discovered this minor planet. Elisa has graduated in linguistic and multimedia communication. || 
|-id=465
| 35465 Emilianoricci ||  || Emiliano Ricci (born 1964) is an Italian science journalist and writer, known for his popularization of astronomy and physics. An astronomy enthusiast from a young age, he is the founder of the Florentine Astronomical Society. || 
|}

35501–35600 

|-id=534
| 35534 Clementfeller ||  || Clement Feller (born 1989) is a postdoctoral researcher at the Physics Institute of Bern University, whose investigations include the photometric properties of cometary nuclei, asteroids and meteorites. || 
|}

35601–35700 

|-id=618
| 35618 Tartu ||  || Tartu, Estonia || 
|-id=646
| 35646 Estela ||  || Estela Fernández-Valenzuela (born 1983) is a postdoctoral researcher at the Florida Space Institute at the University of Central Florida (Orlando, FL). Her studies include trojan asteroids and photometry of and stellar occultations by trans-Neptunian objects. || 
|-id=655
| 35655 Étienneklein ||  || Étienne Klein (born 1958) is a French physicist and philosopher of science. He took part in the development of isotopic separation involving lasers and worked on the design of a superconducting particle accelerator. As a science popularizer he has published numerous books about quantum mechanics and the philosophy of time. || 
|}

35701–35800 

|-id=703
| 35703 Lafiascaia ||  || "La fiascaia", the woman who makes the straw coverings often present on Italian wine bottles, such as for chianti || 
|-id=725
| 35725 Tramuntana ||  || Tramuntana, the principal mountain chain of Mallorca, Spain; it is also the name of the north wind || 
|-id=734
| 35734 Dilithium ||  || A substance of great power in the science fiction universe of Star Trek, dilithium is an essential component for the faster-than-light warp drive depicted in the stories. In the real world, dilithium is a molecule consisting of two covalently-bonded lithium atoms. || 
|-id=768
| 35768 Wendybauer ||  || Wendy Hagen Bauer (born 1950) is a North American professor emerita of astronomy at Wellesley College, where she taught from 1979–2015. A dedicated educator, she taught classes ranging from upper level astronomy seminars on stars, to planetary geology. || 
|-id=769
| 35769 Tombauer ||  || Thomas J. Bauer (born 1955) is a retired physics instructor at Wellesley College, where he taught from 1986 to 2014. He developed instrumentation to use in both introductory and advanced laboratory classes, and developed software to control data collection from spectrometers to oscilloscopes. || 
|}

35801–35900 

|-bgcolor=#f2f2f2
| colspan=4 align=center | 
|}

35901–36000 

|-id=976
| 35976 Yorktown ||  || Yorktown, a town in Virginia on the York River leading into the Chesapeake Bay || 
|-id=977
| 35977 Lexington || 1999 NA || Lexington, Massachusetts, "Birthplace of American Liberty" || 
|-id=978
| 35978 Arlington || 1999 NC || Arlington, Massachusetts, site of the heaviest fighting during the first day of the American Revolutionary War on 19 April 1775 || 
|}

References 

035001-036000